Gholam Reza Enayati (born 23 September 1976) is an Iranian football manager and former player. He is a former member of Iran national football team. Enayati played as a striker and is the all-time top goalscorer in the Persian Gulf Pro League.

Club career
Reza Enayati started out his professional career playing for his hometown club Aboomoslem. He had a number of impressive seasons there, especially the 2001–02 season where he finished as the league's top goalscorer and was called up to the national team.

He remained in Aboomoslem for the 2002–03 season but the year after and after being linked with a move to Persepolis, he signed with Esteghlal. He was not able to impress in his first season in Tehran, but in the 2004–05 season he was able to show his talents and was able to finish as the IPL's top goalscorer again with 20 goals. The next season, he was just as impressive, scoring 21 goals, finishing as the league's top scorer and helping his club Esteghlal win the championship and also broke the record of scoring in a season in Iran and he is the all-time top scorer of Persian Gulf Cup. After World Cup 2006 he signed with the Emirates club.
On 19 March 2007, Enayati extended his contract with UAE League side Al-Emarat in a deal that will keep him there until the end of the 2007–08 season.

In 2008, he secured a six-month contract with Al-Nasr. In July 2009 season he moved back to Esteghlal but after half a season he moved to Emirate league once again and joined Emirates where he scored 8 goals. For 2010–11 season Enayati signed with Sepahan for one year and joined his former coach Amir Ghalenoei where he helped the club to win the league title. He then joined to Saba Qom and later Mes Kerman. He returned to Saba on 1 July 2013. On 7 May 2014, he signed a contract with Padideh, effective from 1 July. He was given number 10 shirt. He made his debut for Padideh in 0–0 draw against Malavan on 1 August 2014. He scored his first goal for Padideh in next match, where they won the match against Naft Masjed Soleyman 3–0, which Enayati scored the final goal.

Enayati moved back to Esteghlal on 31 December 2014.

Club career statistics

1 Statistics Incomplete.

The information in Hazfi Cup and UAE Emir Cup is not complete

Assist Goals

International career
Reza Enayati made his debut for Iran in a game versus Palestine in April 2002. Since then he has had numerous callups to the national team, including Iran's recent 2004 Asian Cup and 2006 FIFA World Cup Qualifying campaigns. He was among Iran's final squad for World Cup 2006 but did not make an appearance.

He has been selected to join the squad for the 2007 Asian Nations Cup in Kuala Lumpur, Malaysia. He appeared against the Uzbekistan national football team, playing 90 minutes, on 11 July, and was selected again into the starting eleven in the game against the China national football team on 15 July. He was called up again for 2010 FIFA World Cup Qualifying but left the camp in the first round as Ali Daei preferred Mohsen Khalili in few matches over him.

International goals

Managerial statistics

Honours

Player
Esteghlal
Iran Pro League: 2005–06; runner-up 2003–04

Sepahan
Iran Pro League: 2010–11

Individual
Iran Pro League top goalscorer: 2001–02 (17 goals), 2004–05 (20 goals), 2005–06 (21 goals)
Top scorer in Iran Pro League (154 goals)

Manager
Havadar
Azadegan League runner-up: 2020–21

References

External links

 List of IPL all-time top goal scorers
 
 Reza Enayati at TeamMelli.com

1976 births
Living people
Iranian footballers
Esteghlal F.C. players
2004 AFC Asian Cup players
2006 FIFA World Cup players
2007 AFC Asian Cup players
Iranian expatriate footballers
F.C. Aboomoslem players
Sepahan S.C. footballers
emirates Club players
Saba players
Sanat Mes Kerman F.C. players
Shahr Khodro F.C. players
Siah Jamegan players
Persian Gulf Pro League players
Iran international footballers
Al-Nasr SC (Dubai) players
UAE Pro League players
Iranian expatriate sportspeople in the United Arab Emirates
Expatriate footballers in the United Arab Emirates
Sportspeople from Mashhad
Association football forwards
Havadar S.C. managers
Persian Gulf Pro League managers